{{safesubst:#invoke:RfD|||month = March
|day = 18
|year = 2023
|time = 15:38
|timestamp = 20230318153854

|content=
REDIRECT Prey (2022 film)

}}